Hamilton West is a suburb in western Hamilton in New Zealand.

Hamilton Lake (a.k.a. Lake Rotoroa) is located to the west. To the east is the Waikato River and the Victoria Bridge, which links with Hamilton East on the other side of the river. To the north are Hamilton Central (the business and shopping centre of the city) and then Hamilton North. To the south is the suburb of Melville.

Hamilton West is located close to the central part of the city of Hamilton, known as Hamilton Central, where notable attractions bordering on Hamilton West include Waikato Museum and St Peter's Cathedral, the Anglican cathedral for the Diocese of Waikato, both on Victoria Street.

The former office of the Waikato District Hospital and Charitable Aid Board, now Diggers Bar and Café is located in the suburb.

Demographics

Hamilton West had a population of 1,671 at the 2018 New Zealand census, an increase of 183 people (12.3%) since the 2013 census, and an increase of 249 people (17.5%) since the 2006 census. There were 633 households, comprising 816 males and 855 females, giving a sex ratio of 0.95 males per female. The median age was 32.9 years (compared with 37.4 years nationally), with 210 people (12.6%) aged under 15 years, 516 (30.9%) aged 15 to 29, 693 (41.5%) aged 30 to 64, and 252 (15.1%) aged 65 or older.

Ethnicities were 60.5% European/Pākehā, 18.5% Māori, 4.1% Pacific peoples, 26.9% Asian, and 2.9% other ethnicities. People may identify with more than one ethnicity.

The percentage of people born overseas was 36.3, compared with 27.1% nationally.

Although some people chose not to answer the census's question about religious affiliation, 36.4% had no religion, 41.1% were Christian, 1.1% had Māori religious beliefs, 7.5% were Hindu, 2.0% were Muslim, 0.9% were Buddhist and 6.8% had other religions.

Of those at least 15 years old, 540 (37.0%) people had a bachelor's or higher degree, and 219 (15.0%) people had no formal qualifications. The median income was $28,500, compared with $31,800 nationally. 207 people (14.2%) earned over $70,000 compared to 17.2% nationally. The employment status of those at least 15 was that 717 (49.1%) people were employed full-time, 210 (14.4%) were part-time, and 69 (4.7%) were unemployed.

Education
The school was established in 1864.

See also
Hamilton West electoral ward
Suburbs of Hamilton, New Zealand

References

Suburbs of Hamilton, New Zealand